Ashes of Love is a 2018 Chinese television series based on the novel Heavy Sweetness, Ash-like Frost (2009) by Dian Xian. It stars Yang Zi as Jin Mi and Deng Lun as Xu Feng in the lead roles. The series premiered on Jiangsu TV starting August 2, 2018.

The series reached 100 million views in just 15 minutes after the broadcast of the first episode. As of January 2019, the series has reached over 15 billion views.

Plot
Zifen the Flower Deity died after giving birth to a daughter, Jinmi. She foresaw a future where her daughter would suffer a great love trial within the first ten thousand years of her life. Therefore, before dying she gave Jinmi a magical pellet that prevented her from feeling and expressing romantic love. Jinmi grew up in the Flower Realm, living as a low-level immortal. Her peaceful life was interrupted when she encountered the Fire Deity, Xufeng, from the Heavenly Realm. Persuading him to take her to see the Heavenly Realm, Jinmi met Xufeng's half-brother, the Night Deity Runyu. She also meets Princess Sui He, who is a close ally of Xufeng's mother, the Holy Empress, and as a result, Sui He believes she will one day marry Xufeng. Both Xufeng and Runyu take an interest in Jinmi and due to the pellet, Jinmi becomes unwittingly involved in a love triangle between the two brothers, who grow to become rivals due to Jinmi and the machinations of the Holy Empress. Jinmi also learns of her true nature as a child of the late Flower Deity and the current Water Deity.

Eventually, Jinmi is tricked by Runyu into thinking her father died at the hands of Xufeng and she kills him, coughing up the magic pellet as a consequence. Xufeng is later reborn in the Demon Realm. Soon named as the new Demon King, he wages war against Runyu, who has now ascended the throne as Heavenly Emperor and plans to make Jinmi Holy Empress. Sui He, who went to Demon realm with Xufeng, tricks Xufeng into agreeing to marry her so she can become Demon Queen, but she is finally defeated when Xufeng learns the truth of his rebirth. A final battle arrives, with a duel to the death taking place between Runyu and Xufeng. Jinmi, wanting to stop the loss of innocent lives, ultimately sacrifices herself to end the war and return peace to the world.

In the aftermath, Xufeng tirelessly travels the six realms to search for the remains of Jinmi's soul. For three years his search is unsuccessful until he discovers that Jinmi was, in fact, a teardrop in his eye. Realising that Jinmi will one day be reincarnated, Xufeng resolves to wait for her.

Five hundred years pass. Jinmi is reborn alongside her father in the Mortal Realm. On the day of her arranged wedding, Xufeng arrives in his phoenix form and reunites with Jinmi, who has retained her memories. They elope.

Seven years later, Liuying works to bring a new age of prosperity to the Demon Realm. Suihe, sent mad by her defeat, rambles in the Demon Realm's outskirts. One day, she mistook an entrance to be the Holy Empress' throne, stumbles into the same cave where she once threw the old Demon King's sons when they insulted her. This led to her being eaten alive by one of the remaining sons. He appears to have eaten his brother.

In the Heavenly Realm, Runyu rules alone as Celestial Emperor. He notes this to his faithful servant Kuanglu. She renews her vow to always be by his side. In the Mortal Realm, Jinmi and Xufeng live a carefree life and have a son, who knows the story of his parents and tells it proudly.

Cast

Main

 Yang Zi as Jinmi (锦觅)
 A grape spirit, whose real identity is a six-petal frost flower fairy. Daughter of the Flower Deity and Water Deity. She is naive and altruistic but does not understand the true meaning of love due to the magical pellet she was given at birth. She later becomes the Water Deity following her father's death.
 Deng Lun as Xufeng (旭凤)
 Second prince of the Heavenly Realm and the legitimate heir of the Heavenly Throne; the Fire Deity, God of War, and the Commander of the Divine Armies of 8 Directions. He becomes King Yi of Huaiwu Kingdom, a warrior king in the Mortal Realm in his mortal trial. His true form is that of a phoenix. He becomes the Demon King after his rebirth in the Demon Realm.
 Luo Yunxi as Runyu (润玉)
 Eldest prince of the Heavenly Realm; the Night Deity. A gentle and calm person, he never makes a move without being certain of the outcome. He later seizes the throne after his birth mother's death. His true form is that of a dragon.
 Wang Yifei as Suihe (穗禾)
 Princess of the Bird Tribe; proud and arrogant, she wields great responsibility in securing power within the Bird tribe. A close ally of the Holy Empress, she goes on to commit many cruel deeds in her attempt to obtain power and marry Xufeng. Her true form is that of a peacock.
 Chen Yuqi as Liuying (鎏英)
 Demon Princess. A cheerful and forthright girl, and a heroic warrior. She has a tragic romantic relationship with her bodyguard, Muci.
 Zou Tingwei as Qiyuan (奇鸢), Muci (暮辭)
 A reaper who has double identities. He was forced to commit evil deeds for the Heavenly Empress due to her control and manipulation, but he remains kind at heart. He has a tragic romantic relationship with Liuying.

Supporting

Heaven realm

 He Zhonghua as Taiwei (太微)
 Heavenly Emperor. Ruler of the Heaven realm. A first good hearted later cruel , he is adept at making use of other people to achieve his goals. His true form is that of a golden dragon.
 Kathy Chow as Tuyao (荼姚)
 Heavenly Empress. Ruler of the Bird Tribe. A scheming and cruel woman who caused the death of the Flower Deity, along with many others. She schemes to get rid of any threats to Xufeng's ascension to Heavenly Emperor, including Jinmi and Runyu.
 Xia Zhiyuan as Dan Zhu (丹朱), Match Maker, Moon Immortal (月下仙人), Fox Immortal (狐狸仙）
 The Moon Immortal Yuexia. His true form is that of a fox. Taiwei's younger brother; Xufeng and Runyu's uncle. Known for his mischievous personality and youthful looks, he is in charge of love and marriage of all mortal beings. He is earnest in bringing Xufeng and Jin Mi together as a couple.
 Wang Renjun as Luolin (洛霖)
 Water Deity. Jin Mi's father and Zifen's former lover. An elegant and refined man who keeps himself out of worldly affairs, but is loyal and helpful to those in need.
 Wang Yuanke as Lin Xiu (临秀)
 Wind Immortal. Luolin's betrothed wife. A kind and gentle woman who was a good friend of Zifen and, later, treats Jin Mi as her own.
 Fan Mianlin as Suli (簌离)
 Dragon Fish Princess. Lord of Dongting lake. Runyu's birth mother, who gave birth to him after being seduced by the Heavenly Emperor, which was due to her resemblance to Zifen. She schemed for years to seek revenge on the Heavenly Empress for killing her tribe.
 Liao Jingfeng as Lord Puchi (扑哧君), Yanyou (彦佑)
 Snake Immortal. After getting banished from the Heaven realm, he was adopted by Suli and became one of her god-sons. He goes along with his adoptive mother's schemes. He befriended Jinmi after saving her from the attack of Qiongqi nine hundred years ago.
 Du Yuchen as Kuang Lu (邝露)
 Daughter of Immortal Taiji. She voluntarily becomes Runyu's subordinate due to her admiration for him, and remains loyal to him from then on.
 Sa Dingding as Immortal Yuanji (缘机仙子)
 An immortal who is in charge of the fate and destiny of human beings. She has a friendship with Moon Immortal.
 Zhang Junran as Lord Liaoyuan (燎原君), Qin Tong (秦潼)
 Xufeng's personal guard.
 Li Yixuan as Lord Doumu (斗姆元君)
 Luolin, Lin Xiu and Zifen's teacher.
 Li Yongtian as Taishang Laojun (太上老君)
 Zhang Shihong as Immortal Taiji (太巳仙人)
 He Junlin as Thunder God Yunxiang (云响雷公)
 Liu Siying as Lightning Goddess, Shengguang (圣光电母)
 Li Xuefeng as Rat Immortal (鼠仙)
 Leader of the Zodiac Immortals. Suli's subordinate, who helps her collect information in the Heaven realm.
 Zhang Xiaoyang as Liao Ting (了听)
 Xufeng's subordinate.
 Cui Binbin as Fei Xu (飞絮)
 Xufeng's subordinate.
 Zheng Ge as Po Jun (破军)
 A heavenly soldier recruited by Xufeng.
 Fu Hongsheng as Yinque (隐雀)
 Elder of Bird Tribe.
 Dong Xiaobai as Queling (雀灵)
 Suihe's subordinate.
 Liu Haochen as Lianchao (廉晁)
 Brother of Taiwei, and Tuyao's first love.
 Liu Xiangping as Earth Deity (土地仙)
 Zhong Sutong as Little Fairy (小仙女)

Flower realm

 Zhang Yanyan as Zifen (梓芬)
 Flower Deity. Ruler of the Flower Realm. Jinmi's mother. She died in childbirth after being attacked by the Holy Empress.
 Peng Yang as Chief Peony (牡丹芳主)
 Head of the Pavilion chiefs.
 Ma Jing as Chief Begonia (海棠芳主)
 Wen Luhan as Chief Magnolia (玉兰芳主)
 Furou Meiqi as Rourou (肉肉), Qianghuo (羌活)
 A succulent plant sprite. Jinmi's close friend, who died saving Jinmi from Qiongqi's attacks. She is later revived to accompany Jin Mi in her mortal trial.
 Ning Wentong as Lao Hu (老胡)
 Carrot sprite. An elder of the Flower Realm.
 Xia Yiyao as Lianqiao (廉晁)
 A flower sprite.
 Wu Wenxuan as Pavilion Chief (芳主)
 Duan Yu as Pavilion Chief (芳主)

Demon realm

 Lu Yong as King Yancheng (焱城王)
 Ruler of the Demon realm.
 Yao Qingren as King Biancheng (卞城王)
 Liuying's father.
 Song Yunhao as King Gucheng (固城王)
 An ambitious man who aims to usurp the throne.
 Wang Siyu as Chishou (炽狩)
 Son of King Yancheng.
 Li Silang as Xuanshou (炫狩)
 Son of King Yancheng.
 Hu Mianyang as Qiongqi (穷奇)
 A ferocious and legendary beast.

Mortal realm

 Sun Ning as Lord Nanping (南平侯)
 A royal of Huaiwu Kingdom and Suihe's father in the human realm. He aims to kill Xufeng during his mortal trial and usurp the throne.
 Zhou Yihua as Chancellor Fu (傅相)
 Chancellor of the Huaiwu Kingdom.
 Tuo Gufeng as General Ji Chong (偏将齐冲)
 Lord Nanping's subordinate.
 Wen Jing as Jingjie (荆芥)
 Elder of the Healer Tribe. She adopted Jinmi as a child during her mortal trial.

Production
The series began filming in June 2017 and finished in October 2017.

Soundtrack

Ratings

 Highest ratings are marked in red, lowest ratings are marked in blue

Reception 
This drama was commercially successful, placing first among audience ratings in its time slot and reaching over ten billion views.
It also received positive reviews, scoring a 7.7 on Douban. The drama was praised for its light-hearted yet grounded storyline, high production quality of beautiful cinematography and exquisite costumes; as well as the well-constructed plot and excellent performance of the actors.

Awards and nominations

International broadcast
  - 8TV (Malaysia) (26 November 2018)
  - E-Le (10 December 2018)
  - tvN Asia (22 January 2019)
  on Ctv8 hd
  on Netflix
  on Netflix
  on Netflix
 on Netflix
  on Netflix
  on Netflix
  on Netflix
  on Netflix 
  on Netflix
  on Netflix
  on Netflix 
  on Netflix
  on Netflix
  on Netflix
  on Netflix
  on Netflix
  on Netflix
  on Netflix
  on Netflix
  on Netflix
  on Netflix
  on Netflix
  on Netflix
  on Netflix
  on Netflix
  on Netflix

References

External links

Chinese romantic fantasy television series
Television shows based on Chinese novels
2018 Chinese television series debuts
Television series by Perfect World Pictures
Xianxia television series
2018 Chinese television series endings